The Messerschmitt Me 328 was originally designed as a parasite aircraft to protect Luftwaffe bomber formations during World War II. During its protracted development, a wide variety of other roles were suggested for it. Late in the war, the design was resurrected for consideration as a Selbstopfer (suicide weapon) aircraft, but was judged unsuitable even for this purpose. The tiny fighter was to have been propelled by pulsejets, but the unsuitability of these engines doomed the Me 328 from the start.

History

Design
The aircraft was designed as Messerschmitt project P.1073 in 1941, and was originally conceived as a cheap and simple escort fighter, to either be towed aloft by a Heinkel He 177 heavy bomber or Junkers Ju 388 using a semi-rigid bar (the Deichselschlepp, which was also considered for towing winged auxiliary fuel tanks), or carried on a Me 264 in a Mistel type fashion. Three versions were proposed: an unpowered glider, a version powered by Argus pulsejets, and a version powered by a Jumo 004 turbojet.

Its construction was to be mainly of wood. It was subsequently handed over to the Deutsche Forschungsanstalt für Segelflug (DFS - "German Research Institute for Sailplane Flight") for development. Two versions were proposed, the Me 328A (fighter) and the Me 328B (bomber); it was estimated that four Me 328s could be built for the cost of a Focke-Wulf Fw 190 or Bf 109 fighter. It was also suggested at one point that it be towed behind the Me 264 heavy bomber for protection.
One of the main problems that the project faced was with engines - the pulse jets didn't operate well at high to medium altitudes (where most combat would take place) due to the lower air pressure. The engines also generated a huge amount of noise which could be heard miles away, making them unsuitable.  The excessive vibration of the engine would be compounded by the fact that in a twin-engined craft the two pulsejets would be producing oscillations in their own unique thrust cycle, which would cause instability due to asymmetry as well as resonance.

Prototypes
Ground launches, using both cable-type catapults and rocket-assisted carriages on rails were also successful. Even with a reduced wingspan the aircraft had a very satisfactory performance, and it was planned to build up to 1,000 for use as disposable bombers to be flown by volunteers from 5/KG200, the so-called Leonidas Squadron.

Seven prototypes powered by two Argus As 014 pulsejets, as used on the V-1 flying bomb were built by glider manufacturer, Jacobs-Schweyer of Darmstadt. It was intended for use as a fighter aircraft, to be armed with two 20 mm MG 151/20 cannons. However, during static testing it soon became apparent that the same problems which were to plague the early development of the V-1 flying bomb - namely, excessive vibration - would make the project difficult to bring to a successful conclusion, and the manned flight programme was suspended in mid-1944, after only a few test flights had been made. Some sources say two prototypes were destroyed by inflight structural failure caused by vibration.

Despite this, planning continued, and a version was projected, which would use four Argus pulsejets, two mounted below the wings in addition to the original pair mounted above the rear fuselage. Bomber versions of both types were proposed, and work continued on them at the insistence of Adolf Hitler long after the point when anything other than token use could have been made of them.

Moves were made to revive the Me 328 again in 1944 as a piloted flying bomb based on the Me 328B, fitted with a  bomb, but it was dropped in favour of the Fieseler Fi 103R (Reichenberg). Two differing revised versions -  one designated as the Me 328C, to be fitted with a Jumo 004 turbojet — and another, in-house proposal that did not receive a letter suffix, used two As 014 pulsejets mounted on pylons mounted onto the rear fuselage sides — refitted with a twin tail empennage design — along with a Porsche 109-005 single-use turbojet of  thrust in the same dorsal rear location as meant for its use on the V-1, allowed with the new twin-tail design — but neither of these proposals came to anything. Owing to the basic idea of short-life reaction propulsion units to power it, the Me 328 project is often listed as a suicide weapon, however the aircraft was not intended as such.

Proposed roles
A wide variety of roles were suggested for the aircraft, ranging from a point-defence interceptor, to a version with folding wings and twin pulsejets to be launched from a catapult on a U-boat, to a ground-attack aircraft. Various modifications to the prototypes were made to evaluate their suitability for these missions, and different engine configurations were tested. Despite all this, the vibration problem simply could not be overcome and the program was abandoned in early 1944, even as production facilities were being readied to construct the aircraft at the Jacobs Schweyer sailplane factory in Darmstadt.

According to Thomas Powers's book Heisenberg's War the idea of using the Me 328 as a parasite bomber within the Amerika Bomber program was explored. It was to be carried by or towed behind either an Me 264 or a Ju 390 to attack New York City. Plans for this tactic — first proposed as much as nine months before Heinkel's trans-Atlantic Amerika Bomber design competitor received its own RLM designation — were hatched from a meeting between Generalfeldmarschall Erhard Milch and Generalmajor Eccard Freiherr von Gablenz at Berlin on 12 May 1942. After release, the Me 328 pilot would release a bomb over Manhattan and then ditch at sea near a U-boat. The idea was dropped in August 1942.

Variants
Me 328 glider Two prototype glider aircraft built by Jacobs-Schweyer Flugzeugbau G.m.b.H. (Hans Jacob). Carried piggy-back on a Dornier Do 217 and released for flight test, at times by Hanna Reitsch.
Me 328 V1 to V7 Seven pre-production prototypes of the Me 328B, also built by Jacobs-Schweyer, powered by Argus AS 014 pulse-jet engines.
Me 328AThe proposed parasite fighter intended for carriage by the Amerika Bomber,
Me 328BThe proposed bomber variant.
Me 328CJumo 004 powered fighter derivative proposed in 1944.

Specifications (Me 328B)

Replica 

One replica is on display at the Military Aviation Museum in Virginia Beach, Virginia.

See also
Emergency Fighter Program
Blohm & Voss P 213
Messerschmitt P.1079
Junkers EF 126

Notes

References

External links

Warbirds Resource Group
Jets 45
Messerschmitt Me-328 V1 PM Models
Messerschmitt Me 328

Abandoned military aircraft projects of Germany
1940s German fighter aircraft
Me 328
Parasite aircraft
Pulsejet-powered aircraft
World War II jet aircraft of Germany
Twinjets
Low-wing aircraft